Russian History is a quarterly peer-reviewed academic journal covering research on the history of Russia, Slavic studies, and Eurasian studies published by Brill Publications under its imprint Verlag Ferdinand Schöningh. It was established in 1974 and the editor-in-chief is Lawrence N. Langer (University of Connecticut).

Abstracting and indexing
The journal is abstracted and indexed in:
Arts and Humanities Citation Index
Current Contents/Arts & Humanities
EBSCO databases
Index Islamicus
Modern Language Association Database
ProQuest databases
Scopus

References

External links

Publications established in 1974
European history journals
Historiography of the Soviet Union
Quarterly journals
History of Russia (1991–present)
Brill Publishers academic journals
English-language journals